Yondonjamtsyn Batsükh (born 27 September 1945) is a Mongolian former sports shooter. He competed at the 1968 Summer Olympics and the 1972 Summer Olympics.

References

External links
 

1945 births
Living people
Mongolian male sport shooters
Olympic shooters of Mongolia
Shooters at the 1968 Summer Olympics
Shooters at the 1972 Summer Olympics
20th-century Mongolian people